The Landtag of the Republic of Baden was the representative legislative body for the Republic of Baden from 1919 to 1934 during the time of the Weimar Republic. It succeeded the second chamber of the Badische Ständeversammlung (Chamber of Estates) of the Grand Duchy of Baden. Through most of the Weimar period, the Landtag was dominated by parties of the Weimar Coalition, with the Catholic Centre Party as the largest party. 

After the Nazis came to power at the national level, they instituted the Gleichschaltung (coordination) process by enacting the "Provisional Law on the Coordination of the States with the Reich" on 30 March 1933. This dissolved all the sitting Landtage and reconstituted them on the basis of the recent 5 March 1933 Reichstag election results, which had given the Nazi Party and its coalition partner the DNVP a working majority. In Baden, this resulted in the Weimar Coalition parties being reduced from 58 seats to 25, while the Nazis and their partner increased their representation from 9 to 32. During its last session (6 March to 14 October 1933) the Landtag only held three sittings between 16 May and 9 June 1933 and passed no significant legislation. On 14 October the Landtag was dissolved along with those of all the German states and no new elections were scheduled. On 30 January 1934, the Reich government enacted the "Law on the Reconstruction of the Reich", formally abolishing all the Landtage and transferring the sovereignty of the states to the central government.

Legal basis and structure

Sessions

Presidents

Elections

Party leaders

References

Bibliography 
 Michael Braun: Der Badische Landtag 1918–1933. Handbuch der Geschichte des deutschen Parlamentarismus. Droste Verlag, Düsseldorf 2010, .
 Martin Furtwängler (Bearbeitg.): Die Protokolle der Regierung der Republik Baden. Erster Band: die provisorische Regierung November 1918 – März 1919. W. Kohlhammer, Stuttgart 2012, .

External links 
  Digitalisierte Protokolle der Badischen Ständeversammlung: Badische Landesbibliothek Karlsruhe

1919 establishments in Germany
1934 disestablishments in Germany
Defunct lower houses
Historical legislatures in Germany
History of Karlsruhe
History of Baden